
The computer program AmigaTeX is a port of Knuth's  typesetting program TeX, and was originally written in WEB and translated to C by Tomas Rokicki. This translation was necessary because of the lack of a suitable Pascal compiler for the Amiga computer.

Features 
AmigaTeX has several features not available in standard TeX:
 ARexx port for example with CygnusEd
 Preview
 Interchange File Format graphics integration

See also 
 LuaTeX
 XeTeX

References

External links
 Review
 A Brief History of LaTeX.
 Demo version

TeX
Amiga software